Maxim Dormidontovich Mikhailov (– Moscow 30 March 1971) was a Russian bass. His son, Igor Mikhailov (1920-1983) was the bass of the Bolshoi for several decades. His grandson Maxim Mikhailov (1962–2018) was also a bass singer.

Mikhailov was born in Koltsovka, Kazan Governorate. He had no musical training beyond that as an archdeacon in the Russian Orthodox Church, but was a physical phenomenon with enormous depth and volume. He was directly recruited as a singer by the Soviet authorities, his beard was shaved but he did not abdicate his curacy, and sent to study in preparation for the Bolshoi Theatre. He became Joseph Stalin's favorite singer and most famous interpreter of the role of Ivan Susanin in the reworked "patriotic" Soviet version of the opera of that name, formerly and since better known as Mikhail Glinka's A Life for the Tsar. Mikhailov sang Susanin nearly 400 times from his first performance of the role in 1939 to his last stage appearance in 1957. He also was frequently invited by Stalin to sing and drink with him late at night in Moscow Kremlin.

In addition to Susanin, Mikhailov was a renowned interpreter of other bass and basso profondo roles in Russian opera: Pimen in Boris Godunov, the miller in Dargomyzhsky's Rusalka, Khan Konchak in Prince Igor, the Viking merchant in Sadko, Gremin in Eugene Onegin.

Mikhailov recorded many of his trademark arias under the conductors Nikolai Golovanov, Alexander Melik-Pashaev, Alexander Orlov, and Samuil Samosud. Among his recordings of songs, particularly well known with the pianists Nikolai Korolykov and Naum Walter are "O gentle autumn night" by Glinka, [Dargomyzhsky's "The Civil Servant", Viktor Kalinnikov's "On the Old Burial Mound", "The Blacksmith" by Yuri S. Sakhnovsky (1866–1930) and "The Seafarers" by Konstantin P. Vilboa (1817–1882). Mikhailov also performed and recorded famous folk songs, such as "Song of the Volga Boatmen", in Rachmaninov's arrangement for solo singer and piano, and "The sun rises and the sun sets" and "Through the wild mysterious Taiga" with the Russian Folk Orchestra conducted by D. Ospioc.

Filmography

References

1893 births
1971 deaths
People from Chuvashia
People from Yadrinsky Uyezd
Russian Orthodox clergy
Operatic basses
Soviet male opera singers
Russian basses
20th-century Russian male opera singers
People's Artists of the USSR
Stalin Prize winners
Recipients of the Order of Lenin
Recipients of the Order of the Red Banner of Labour